Eiler Hagerup (1736–1795) was a Norwegian lawyer and government official.  He was the son of Eiler Hansen Hagerup.  He served as the County Governor of Finnmark county from 1768 until 1771. After this, he had a job in Copenhagen in Denmark at the Finance College, an administrative agency that oversaw the financial management of the Kingdoms of Denmark-Norway.

References

1736 births
1795 deaths
County governors of Norway